The Jiulong Bridge is a historic stone arch bridge over the Qinhuai River in Qinhuai District, Nanjing, Jiangsu, China.

History
Originally built in the early Ming dynasty (1368–1644), the bridge also known as "Tongji Bridge" because of its proximity to Tongji Gate. The present version was completed in 1884 during the ruling of Guangxu Emperor of the Qing dynasty (1644–1911).

In 1937, a section of the bridge was bombed by Japanese fighters during the Second Sino-Japanese War. After the founding of the Communist State in 1949, it was restored, and cement bridge fences were added and pavement was paved. In June 2006, it has been designated as a municipal cultural heritage conservation unit by the Government of Nanjing.

References

Bridges in Jiangsu
Arch bridges in China
Bridges completed in 1884
Qing dynasty architecture
Buildings and structures completed in 1884
1884 establishments in China